The Chainless was a French automobile manufactured from 1900 to 1903 in Paris by SA des Voitures Légère Chainless.  The cars used  Abeille or Buchet engines of 10, 16, and 20 cv, were shaft-driven voiturettes.

References
David Burgess Wise, The New Illustrated Encyclopedia of Automobiles.

Defunct motor vehicle manufacturers of France